Hubert Reeves (born July 13, 1932),  is a Canadian astrophysicist and popularizer of science.

Early life and education
Reeves was born in Montreal on July 13, 1932, and as a child lived in Léry. Reeves attended Collège Jean-de-Brébeuf, a prestigious French-language college in Montreal. He obtained a BSc degree in physics from the Université de Montréal in 1953, an MSc degree from McGill University in 1956 with a thesis entitled "Formation of Positronium in Hydrogen and Helium" and a PhD degree at Cornell University in 1960. His PhD thesis was "Thermonuclear Reaction Involving Medium Light Nuclei."

Career
From 1960 to 1964, he taught physics at the Université de Montréal and worked as an advisor to NASA. He has been a Director of Research at the French National Centre for Scientific Research (CNRS) since 1965.

Personal life
Reeves resides in Paris, France. He often speaks on television, promoting science.

Honours and recognition
 In 1976, he was made Knight of Ordre national du Mérite (France).
 In 1986, he was made Knight of the Légion d'Honneur (France). He was promoted to Officer in 1994 and to Commander in 2003.
 In 1991, he was made an Officer of the Order of Canada and was promoted to Companion in 2003.
 In 1994, he was made Officer of the National Order of Quebec. He was promoted to Grand Officer in 2017.
 Asteroid 9631 Hubertreeves is named after Reeves: see Meanings of asteroid names (9501-10000).
 In 2011, the Prix Hubert-Reeves was created.
 In 2019, he received the Prix Jules Janssen, the highest award of the Société astronomique de France.

Selected publications
 
 
 
 
 
 
 
 
 
 Reeves, Hubert; Boutinot, Nelly; Casanave, Daniel; Champion, Claire (2017). Hubert Reeves nous explique la biodiversité. Bruxelles: Le Lombard. .
 Reeves, Hubert; Boutinot, Nelly; Casanave, Daniel; Champion, Claire (2018). Hubert Reeves nous explique la forêt. Bruxelles: Le Lombard. .
 Reeves, Hubert; Vandermeulen, David; Casanave, Daniel (2019). Hubert Reeves nous explique les océans. Bruxelles: Le Lombard. .
 Reeves, Hubert, Michel Cassé, Étienne Klein, Marc Lachièze-Rey, Roland Lehoucq, Jean-Pierre Luminet, Nathalie Palanque-Delabrouille, Nicolas Prantzos, and Sylvie Vauclair. (2019). Petite histoire de la matière et de l'univers.

References

External links

 
  
 Biography in English

1932 births
Living people
Albert Einstein Medal recipients
Canadian astrophysicists
Canadian environmentalists
Canadian expatriates in France
Canadian people of English descent
Canadian people of French descent
Canadian science writers
Companions of the Order of Canada
Cornell University alumni
French National Centre for Scientific Research scientists
McGill University alumni
Scientists from Montreal
Scientists from Paris
Commandeurs of the Légion d'honneur
Knights of the Ordre national du Mérite
Grand Officers of the National Order of Quebec
Université de Montréal alumni
Writers from Montreal
Writers from Paris
20th-century Canadian astronomers
20th-century Canadian male writers
20th-century Canadian non-fiction writers
20th-century Canadian physicists
20th-century French physicists
21st-century French physicists
Research directors of the French National Centre for Scientific Research